David Love may refer to:
 David Love (geologist) (1913–2002), American field geologist
 David J. Love, American electrical engineer
 David Love (political candidate), 2007 political candidate from Manitoba, Canada
 David Love (journalist), author of Unfinished Business: Paul Keating's Interrupted Revolution
 David Love, state senator from Anson County in the North Carolina General Assembly of 1777
 David Love, actor in Teenagers from Outer Space
 David Love, guitarist for the band Iron Butterfly
 David Love, voice actor in The House of Yes